Fencing events were contested at the 1973 Summer Universiade in Moscow, Soviet Union.

Medal overview

Men's events

Women's events

Medal table

References
 Universiade fencing medalists on HickokSports

1973 Summer Universiade
Universiade
Fencing at the Summer Universiade
Fencing in the Soviet Union
International fencing competitions hosted by Russia